The Saarland national football team  was the association football team representing the Saar Protectorate in international football from 1950 to 1956 during the French occupation following World War II. As France opposed the inclusion of the Saarland in the Federal Republic of Germany until 1956, they administered it separately from Germany as the Saar Protectorate.

As the local population did not want to join France, separate organisations were founded. A National Olympic Committee was founded in 1950, leading to an appearance of Saar at the 1952 Summer Olympics. Also, considering themselves not an independent nation different from Germany, the football team was not designated as a "national team", and was more generally referred to as a "selection" or some similar term.

History
Due to post-war partition, Saarland was separate from both the Federal Republic of Germany (aka West Germany until 1990) and the German Democratic Republic (East Germany). The Saarländischer Fußballbund (SFB) was founded on 25 July 1948 in Sulzbach, with Willy Koch as first chairman. The clubs of the Saarland played in the local Ehrenliga for three seasons from 1948 to 1951, with the exception of the strong 1. FC Saarbrücken club, which played as guests in French Ligue 2 in 1948–49, where they were known as FC Sarrebruck. They easily finished top of the division that season. However, after French clubs voted unanimously against them joining the French Football Federation (resulting in the resignation of president Jules Rimet, who had suggested that Saarbrücken join), the club left the French league. Not interested in rejoining the weak in the Ehrenliga they established a short-lived invitational tournament, the Internationaler Saarlandpokal, which attracted a number of top teams and is regarded as a forerunner to the European Cup. In 1955, Saarbrücken became the sole club representing Saarland in the newborn European Champion Clubs' Cup, winning the first leg in San Siro against the Italian champions AC Milan (3–4), but they were heavily defeated (1–4) and eliminated in the second leg at home by the Lombard opponents. By that time, however, 1.FCS and other leading Saarland clubs had already rejoined the DFB league system, playing in the Oberliga Südwest on a mutual agreement.

On 17 July 1949, the members of the SFB declined a proposal to apply for membership in the French Football Federation by a vote of 609–299 (55 abstentions). Led by new president Hermann Neuberger since 14 May 1950, the SFB became part of FIFA on 12 June 1950, three months before the German Football Association DFB was reinstated, and two years before the East German association was accepted.

The Saarland team was made up largely of footballers from 1. FC Saarbrücken and was buttressed by players from SV Saar 05 Saarbrücken and Borussia Neunkirchen, with occasional representation from clubs including SV St. Ingbert 1945, FC 1912 Ensdorf, and ASC Dudweiler.

The team played only 19 games, 10 of these against "B" squads, but did participate in the 1954 World Cup qualifiers, finishing ahead of Norway in their group by defeating them in Oslo. Prior to the 1954 World Cup in Switzerland, on 5 June, they hosted a game against defending World Champion Uruguay, losing 1–7. Other "A" team opponents in friendlies were Yugoslavia (1–5), the Netherlands (1–2, 2–3) and Switzerland (1–1).
The only match played outside of Europe was against Uruguay in Montevideo.

Following a plebiscite in 1955, the Saarland became part of the Federal Republic of Germany with effect on 1 January 1957. The SFB ended its separate FIFA membership and became part of the DFB as the SFV (de: Saarländischer Fußballverband). Coach Helmut Schön, who had managed the Saarland team since 1952, went on to coach the successful German national team in the 1960s and 1970s. Hermann Neuberger, a native of the Saarland, proposed the foundation of the Bundesliga in 1962, organized the 1974 FIFA World Cup, and served as president of the DFB from 1975 until his death in 1992.

FIFA World Cup record
1950 – Did not enter, accepted as FIFA members only two weeks before the tournament
1954 – Did not qualify

1954 World Cup qualifying

The only time that the Saarland entered the World Cup or European Championship qualifiers was for the 1954 World Cup. They were drawn in Group 1 alongside West Germany and Norway, in a triangular series. In the opening round in summer 1953, they won their only competitive away match, beating Norway 3–2 in Oslo after trailing 0–2, and with only 10 effective players, after an early substitute due to injury, and Theodor Puff staying on the field with a broken fibula. Thus they still topped the group after West Germany drew their game in Oslo. Saarland were emphatically beaten 3–0 by West Germany in Stuttgart and could only manage a 0–0 draw at home against Norway. Both German teams were placed joint first until West Germany beat Norway 5–1, putting an end to Norwegian hopes. The remaining inter-German match, to be played after a four-month winter hiatus, would decide which one of the German teams should advance to the tournament in Switzerland.

Saarland, which had already secured second in the group ahead of Norway, needed a win at home to finish first, yet lost 3–1. Unbeaten West Germany topped the final ranking, went to Switzerland and won the 1954 World Cup there. Sepp Herberger would have capped Kurt Clemens for West Germany, but he was ineligible like all others who had played international games for Saarland.

This was the Saarland's only separate entry in the World Cup; its players, coaches and staff would join West Germany to assist in the defence of the World Cup in 1958.

Player records

In total, 42 players appeared for the Saarland national team. Waldemar Philippi holds the record for the most caps, appearing in 18 out of the team's 19 matches and only missing a friendly against Uruguay in 1954.

Most caps

All goalscorers

Clean sheets
Two goalkeepers managed to keep a clean sheet in Saarland's nineteen matches.

Managers

Match results
19 matches played: 6 wins, 3 draws, 10 losses

Record by opponent

Anthem
Saarland, having just been separated from Germany, did not have a national anthem of its own, and so the first international football fixture (1950 vs. Switzerland) was the reason to establish "Ich weiß, wo ein liebliches, freundliches Tal" as the anthem for such events.

See also
Saarland national football B team

References

External links
Details of all official matches
RSSSF archive of results
RSSSF record of international players

 
Former national association football teams in Europe
1950 establishments in Saar
National sports teams established in 1950